KBZS (106.3 FM) is a radio station broadcasting a mainstream rock format.  Licensed to Wichita Falls, Texas, United States, the station serves the Wichita Falls area.  The station is currently owned by Townsquare Media and features programming from Compass Media Networks and United Stations Radio Networks.

History
The station originated as KTLT on August 24, 1984. On June 16, 2003, the call sign was changed to KBZS.

References

External links
106.3 The Buzz Facebook

BZS
Radio stations established in 1984
Townsquare Media radio stations